Anna Josephine Lawrence (born 9 March 1972 in Howick, Auckland) is a former field hockey midfielder from New Zealand, who finished sixth with her national team at the 2000 Summer Olympics in Sydney.

Lawrence was educated at Diocesan School for Girls in Auckland and moved to Christchurch in 1990. She played inside left or right, and competed for Amsterdam in the Dutch League since 1997. She was Canterbury Winter Sportsperson of the Year in 1998 and has played for The Black Sticks since 1990, and captained the team from 1996 to 2000. She won a bronze medal at the 1998 Commonwealth Games in Kuala Lumpur.

Her business career post hockey included various commercial and marketing roles. These included positions as National Sponsorship Manager for Lion NZ and the National Sponsorship & Communications Director for Lion Australia.

References

External links
 

New Zealand female field hockey players
Olympic field hockey players of New Zealand
Field hockey players at the 1992 Summer Olympics
Field hockey players at the 2000 Summer Olympics
1972 births
Living people
Commonwealth Games bronze medallists for New Zealand
Field hockey players at the 1998 Commonwealth Games
Commonwealth Games medallists in field hockey
20th-century New Zealand women
21st-century New Zealand women
Medallists at the 1998 Commonwealth Games